= Darewali =

- Village
- Country: India
- State: Punjab
- District: Gurdaspur
- Tehsil: Batala
- Region: Majha

Government
  - Type: Panchayat raj
  - Body: Gram panchayat

Population (2011)
  - Total: 1,351
  - Total Households: 248
- Sex ratio 730/648 ♂/♀

Languages
  - Official: Punjabi
- Time zone: UTC+5:30 (IST)
- Telephone: 01871
- ISO 3166 code: IN-PB
- Vehicle registration: PB-18
- Website: gurdaspur.nic.in

Darewali is a village in Batala in Gurdaspur district of Punjab State, India. The village is administrated by a sarpanch, an elected representative of the village.

== Demography ==
In 2011, Darewali had 248 houses and a population of 1,351 of which (730 males, 648 females) according to the report published by Census India in 2011. The literacy rate was 71.17%, lower than the state average of 75.84%. The population of children under the age of 6 years was 158, 11.70% of the population, with a child sex ratio of approximately 756, lower than the state average of 846.

== See also ==
- List of villages in India
